The 1941 Christchurch City mayoral election was held on 17 May. The incumbent, Robert Macfarlane of the Labour Party, did not stand for re-election as he wanted to serve in WWII. Four candidates stood and Ernest Andrews of the conservative Citizens' Association was successful. Andrews was installed on 28 May 1941.

Background
The 1938 Christchurch mayoral election had been won by Robert Macfarlane of the Labour Party, beating John Guthrie of the conservative-leaning Citizens' Association. The city council was made up of 11 Labour members and 5 from the Citizens' Association, which gave the Labour Party a strong majority.

Macfarlane was a strong proponent of war service and was determined to serve himself. He started military training in Burnham in January 1941. When the Christchurch Labour Representation Committee met on 20 February 1941 to elect the candidates for the upcoming local elections on 20 February, Macfarlane announced his retirement from the mayoralty.

Ernest Andrews' candidacy was announced on 5 December 1940. Andrews was a senior councillor with long service and a member of the conservative-leaning Citizens' Association. Andrews responded to a request by a large deputation. His candidacy came outside of the normal Citizens' Association process where several candidates would go through a nomination process. It took until 18 February 1941 before Andrews was confirmed as the official candidate of the Citizens' Association.

Candidates

Ernest Andrews
Ernest Herbert Andrews was a senior city councillor whose candidacy was announced on 5 December 1940. Andrews had been born in 1873 near Nelson. He had studied at Canterbury University College and had been a school teacher in various parts of the country before settling in Christchurch with a printing business in 1907. A representative cricketer, he was involved with numerous organisations. He had continuously been a member of Christchurch City Council since 1919, had chaired almost every council committee, and had been deputy-mayor under John Beanland (1936–1938).

John Moloney
John Keith Moloney, a barrister in Christchurch, announced his candidacy on 5 March. Originally from Dunedin, he had come to Christchurch in the mid-1890s and had been there since with the exception of WWI. He had not previously been on the city council. Moloney had set up and was leading a group called "Win the War". He had been the president of the Canterbury Rugby Union since 1938. He advocated for the amalgamation of various local bodies plus organisations like the Drainage Board, the Fire Board, the Tramway Board, to be administered by Christchurch City Council.

Edward Parlane
The Labour Party candidacy for the mayoralty was first discussed in The Press in December 1940, with the party's preference that a new mayor be elected as opposed to the deputy mayor taking the leadership position if the incumbent, Macfarlane, were to leave the country on war service for an indeterminate length of time. At that point, John Septimus "Jack" Barnett (the present deputy mayor) and Edward Parlane were given as the most likely candidates. Parlane was chosen at the Christchurch Labour Representation Committee meeting on 20 February 1941.

Parlane was born in Rangiora in 1874. He received his education at East Oxford primary school, where he then did farming until age 20 followed by some years of farming in the North Island. He returned to Rangiora and became involved in unions; first the Flourmillers' Union and then the Canterbury Timber Workers' Union in Christchurch. In 1923, he became the secretary of the Timber Workers' Union and still held the position in 1941, as well as secretary of the Canterbury Drivers' Union. He was on the board of Christchurch West High School and was one of the founders of the Addington public library; he served as the library's president for 10 years. He was first elected onto Christchurch City Council in 1929 and lived in Addington's Cotterill Street. His elder brother, Andrew Parlane (born 1869), was elected onto Wellington City Council in 1936.

Charles Thomas Rodda
Charles Thomas Rodda was born on 31 December 1871 in Victoria, Australia. He announced his candidacy on nomination day: 6 May 1941. Rodda was self-employed as a painter and paperhanger. Rodda campaigned that New Brighton be connected to the Christchurch sewerage system, and that the Lyttelton road tunnel and a Christchurch Town Hall be built.

Results
The election was held on Saturday, 17 May 1941, from 9am to 6pm. This was a change from previous elections which had been held on Wednesdays, from 9am to 7pm. The first-past-the-post voting system was used. There were 24 polling booths in Christchurch Central and Richmond, 21 polling booths across Linwood and Woolston, 28 polling booths across St Albans and Papanui, 36 polling booths across Sydenham and Spreydon, 1 polling booth in Lyttelton, and 6 polling booths in New Brighton; a total of 116 booths. Huntsbury and the borough of New Brighton had joined with Christchurch city on 1 April 1941 and polling booths for a Christchurch election were in those areas for the first time.

There were four different bodies elected that day. Apart from the mayoralty, people voted for 16 city councillors (33 candidates), 10 hospital board representatives (22 candidates), and 4 Lyttelton Harbour Board representatives (8 candidates). In addition, the Christchurch Tramway District held elections on that day but while many of the polling booths were the same as for the other elections, this was separately organised.

The election had a poor turnout, much reduced from the 1938 election despite a much larger roll due to the Borough of New Brighton having been added to the city since. Jack Roberts, the president of the Christchurch Labour Representation Committee, lamented that worker apathy had cost his party the election.

Mayoral election results

 
 
 
 

Andrews was installed on 28 May 1941 at a ceremony held at the municipal offices in Manchester Street.

City councillor election results

 
 
 
 
 
 
 
 
 
 
 
 
 
 
 
 
 
 
 
 
 
 
 
 
 
 
 
 
 
 
 
 
 

Andrews was a widower and his late wife's niece, Eveleyn Couzins, acted as mayoress. Andrews remained mayor until his retirement in 1950. Couzins died in 1945 and his daughter Gwendoline took on the role as mayoress.

Notes

References

Mayoral elections in Christchurch
1941 elections in New Zealand
Politics of Christchurch
1940s in Christchurch